Kayanza is a city located in northern Burundi. It is the capital city of Kayanza Province. The city is known for its tea and coffee production. It is one of the areas with higher population density. It is subdivided into nine communes from which one is called Kayanza.

Populated places in Burundi